NOAAS Ferdinand R. Hassler (S 250) is a coastal mapping vessel for the National Oceanic and Atmospheric Administration.  Commissioned on 8 June 2012, Ferdinand R. Hassler is one of the newest additions to the NOAA hydrographic charting fleet.  Operating from the Great Lakes to the Gulf of Mexico, the ship's  primary mission is hydrographic survey in support of NOAA's nautical charting mission.  The ship's home port is New Castle, New Hampshire.

On 8 May 2015, Ferdinand R. Hassler completed a US$1 million overhaul at the United States Coast Guard Yard at Curtis Bay outside Baltimore, Maryland.

References

External links

NOAA Ship Ferdinand R. Hassler website

Ships of the National Oceanic and Atmospheric Administration
Survey ships of the United States
Ships built in Moss Point, Mississippi
2009 ships